Uno Fransson  (18 August 1927 – 4 August 1995) was a Swedish discus thrower. He was born in Gustavsfors, Bengtsfors Municipality.

He competed at the 1948 Summer Olympics in London, where he placed 10th in the final.

References

1927 births
1995 deaths
Swedish male discus throwers
Athletes (track and field) at the 1948 Summer Olympics
Olympic athletes of Sweden